is a railway station in the city of Aisai, Aichi Prefecture, Japan , operated by Central Japan Railway Company (JR Tōkai).

Lines
Eiwa Station is served by the Kansai Main Line, and is located 12.2  kilometers from the starting point of the line at Nagoya Station.

Station layout
The station has two opposed side platforms, with platform 1 adjacent to the station building. The platforms are connected by an uncovered footbridge. Three rail lines pass between the platforms, with the middle, non-electrified line used for freight traffic. The station is staffed.

Platforms

Adjacent stations

|-
!colspan=5|Central Japan Railway Company (JR Tōkai)

Station history
The  was established on the Japanese Government Railways (JGR) Kansai Line on June 1, 1927. This was elevated to become Eiwa Station on February 1, 1929. The JGR became the JNR(Japan National Railways) after World War II. Freight operations were discontinued from October 15, 1950. With the privatization of the JNR on April 1, 1987, the station came under the control of JR Central. Automatic ticket gates using the TOICA smart card were installed from November 25, 2006.

Station numbering was introduced to the section of the Kansai Main Line operated JR Central in March 2018; Eiwa Station was assigned station number CI04.

Passenger statistics
In fiscal 2017, the station was used by an average of 2,384 passengers daily (boarding passengers only).

Surrounding area
Eiwa Elementary School

See also
 List of Railway Stations in Japan

References

External links

Railway stations in Japan opened in 1929
Kansai Main Line
Stations of Central Japan Railway Company
Railway stations in Aichi Prefecture
Aisai, Aichi